Volča (in older sources also Volče) is a village north of Poljane nad Škofjo Loko in the Municipality of Gorenja Vas–Poljane in the Upper Carniola region of Slovenia.

Church

The local church is dedicated to Saint George and dates to the early 16th century. Sixteenth-century frescos are preserved in the sanctuary. The three altars in the church are all gilded and date to the mid-17th century.

References

External links

Volča on Geopedia

Populated places in the Municipality of Gorenja vas-Poljane